The ARWEN 37 is a less-lethal launcher which fires a variety of 37mm less-lethal munitions which includes direct impact batons, chemical irritant delivery munitions and smoke delivery munitions. The ARWEN 37 has 5-round rotary drum magazine.

History 
In 1977 the British government directed their Royal Small Arms Factory (RSAF) Enfield, then part of the Royal Ordnance Factories, to develop a weapon for effective crowd control that would outperform existing weapon systems.

By 1979 a design team led by Norman Trevor Brint designed three prototypes for consideration:

 The Enfield XL75E1, which incorporated a pump action
 The Enfield XL76E1, which incorporated a rotary magazine capable of holding five rounds 
 The Enfield XL77E1, which incorporated a semi automatic box style magazine

After initial testing it was the Enfield XL76E1 which was chosen for further development.  As almost all weapons designed or produced at the Royal Small Arms Factory incorporate the letters EN or the word Enfield into their name, and the fact that it featured a 37mm barrel, the Enfield XL76E1 was officially designated the ARWEN 37 (Anti Riot Weapon ENfield).

General production of the first generation of the ARWEN 37, the Mk I, began in 1984 in Enfield, England.

The second generation of the ARWEN 37, the Mk II, were produced in Nottingham, England.

In 2001, all ARWEN trademarks and patents were acquired by the Canadian Police Ordnance Company Inc., who began production of the third generation, or Mk III, variety of the ARWEN 37.   The launcher is currently manufactured under license in Canada.

Design 
Unlike many 37mm launchers which have a smooth bore, the ARWEN 37 features a rifled barrel.

The launcher features a revolver like rotary magazine which holds five munitions and which allows for a rate of fire of five rounds in four seconds without reloading.  The rotary magazine can be manually downloaded or topped up by the user at any time in a rapid manner.

Many ARWEN 37 parts are constructed of anodized aluminum or proprietary polymer so that the overall weight of the launcher can be kept to an absolute minimum.

Because of their unique design, ARWEN munitions (rounds) act as the chamber for the launcher when it is fired.  This means that the rotary magazine housing can be designed in such a way that the user can easily look inside of the launcher and instantly identify how many and what type of munitions have been loaded into it, an important safety feature.

Munition Types 
The ARWEN 37 is part of a less lethal system which incorporates a variety of less lethal munitions which can be deployed through the same launcher.

The AR-1 munition consists of a proprietary polymer baton which is intended to be deployed at living tissue as a means of inflicting blunt force trauma through direct impact at ranges up to 100 meters / 109.36 yards.

The AR-2 munition consists of an aluminum canister which is intended to deploy a large quantity of pyrotechnic smoke along with a payload of chemical irritant in the form of micronized CS.

The AR-3 munition consists of a proprietary polymer baton which is intended to be deployed at living tissue as a means of inflicting blunt force trauma through direct impact at ranges up to 100 meters / 109.36 yards.  Unlike the AR-1 munition, the AR-3 also contains a discrete payload of chemical irritant in the form of CS or OC powder which are intended to contaminate the target when struck.

The AR-4 munition consists of an aluminum canister which is intended to deploy a large quantity of pyrotechnic smoke suitable for screening purposes in a variety of colours.

The AR-5 munition consists of a composite plastic projectile which is intended to be fired at a physical obstruction such as a window, door or other barricade.  The munition is designed to penetrate and pass through the obstruction at which time it deploys a payload of chemical irritant in the form of micronized CS or OC.

The AR-6 munition consists of either OC or CS chemical irritant powder which is immediately dispersed through the muzzle of the ARWEN when fired and designed to immediately contaminate an individual or area through blast dispersion.

See also
 ARWEN ACE

References
Notes

Bibliography
Bishop, Chris & Drury, Ian (November 1987). Combat Guns. London: Book Sales,

External links
 Police Ordnance products description

Images
 ARWEN 37
 With magazine

Riot guns
Grenade launchers of the United Kingdom
Teargas grenade guns